Ricardo Gumzán Millas (born 4 June 1979) is a Chilean politician who served in the  Chamber of Deputies of Chile.

Early life
Guzmán Millas was born on 4 June 1979. He studied at the Regional Institute of Education (IRE) of Rancagua, from where he graduated in 1996. His Law studies were carried out at the University of the Americas.

Political career
During Sebastián Piñera's first government, he held the position of regional director of the INJUV O'Higgins. In 2011, he assumed the position of councilmen in the Municipality of Rancagua, replacing Pamela Medina. Then, Guzmán was re-elected twice. He remained in office until November 2020, when he resigned with the goal to win the next regional councilor elections. Nevertheless, he finally stepped aside of the race.

On 15 February 2021, President Sebastián Piñera appointed Guzmán Millas as the new Intendant of the O'Higgins Region, replacing Rebeca Cofré.

References

External links
 

1979 births
Living people
21st-century Chilean lawyers
University of the Americas (Chile) alumni
Independent Democratic Union politicians
21st-century Chilean politicians